The energy efficiency in transport is the useful travelled distance, of passengers, goods or any type of load; divided by the total energy put into the transport propulsion means. The energy input might be rendered in several different types depending on the type of propulsion, and normally such energy is presented in liquid fuels, electrical energy or food energy. The energy efficiency is also occasionally known as energy intensity. The inverse of the energy efficiency in transport, is the energy consumption in transport.

Energy efficiency in transport is often described in terms of fuel consumption, fuel consumption being the reciprocal of fuel economy. Nonetheless, fuel consumption is linked with a means of propulsion which uses liquid fuels, whilst energy efficiency is applicable to any sort of propulsion. To avoid said confusion, and to be able to compare the energy efficiency in any type of vehicle, experts tend to measure the energy in the International System of Units, i.e., joules.

Therefore, in the International System of Units, the energy efficiency in transport is measured in terms of metre per joule, or m/J, whilst the energy consumption in transport is measured in terms of joules per metre, or J/m. The more efficient the vehicle, the more metres it covers with one joule (more efficiency), or the fewer joules it uses to travel over one metre (less consumption). The energy efficiency in transport largely varies by means of transport. Different types of transport range from some hundred kilojoules per kilometre (kJ/km) for a bicycle to tens of megajoules per kilometre (MJ/km) for a helicopter.

Via type of fuel used and rate of fuel consumption, energy efficiency is also often related to operating cost ($/km) and environmental emissions (e.g. CO/km).

Units of measurement 
In the International System of Units, the energy efficiency in transport is measured in terms of metre per joule, or m/J. Nonetheless, several conversions are applicable, depending on the unit of distance and on the unit of energy. For liquid fuels, normally the quantity of energy input is measured in terms of the liquid's volume, such as litres or gallons. For propulsion which runs on electricity, normally kW·h is used, while for any type of human-propelled vehicle, the energy input is measured in terms of Calories. It is typical to convert between different types of energy and units.

For passenger transport, the energy efficiency is normally measured in terms of passengers times distance per unit of energy, in the SI, passengers metres per joule (pax.m/J); while for cargo transport the energy efficiency is normally measured in terms of mass of transported cargo times distance per unit of energy, in the SI, kilograms metres per joule (kg.m/J). Volumetric efficiency with respect to vehicle capacity may also be reported, such as passenger-mile per gallon (PMPG), obtained by multiplying the miles per gallon of fuel by either the passenger capacity or the average occupancy. The occupancy of personal vehicles is typically lower than capacity by a considerable degree and thus the values computed based on capacity and on occupancy will often be quite different.

Typical conversions into SI unit

Liquid fuels 
Energy efficiency is expressed in terms of fuel economy:
 distance per vehicle per unit fuel volume; e.g., km/L or miles per gallon (US or imperial).
 distance per vehicle per unit fuel mass; e.g., km/kg.
 distance per vehicle per unit energy; e.g., miles per gallon equivalent (mpg-e).

Energy consumption (reciprocal efficiency) is expressed terms of fuel consumption:
 volume of fuel (or total energy) consumed per unit distance per vehicle; e.g. l/100 km or MJ/100 km.
 volume of fuel (or total energy) consumed per unit distance per passenger; e.g., l/(100 passenger·km).
 volume of fuel (or total energy) consumed per unit distance per unit mass of cargo transported; e.g., l/100 kg·km or MJ/t·km.

Electricity 
Electricity consumption:
 electrical energy used per vehicle per unit distance; e.g., kW·h/100 km.
Producing electricity from fuel requires much more primary energy than the amount of electricity produced.

Food energy 
Energy consumption:
 calories burnt by the body's metabolism per kilometre; e.g., Cal/km.
 calories burnt by the body's metabolism per mile; e.g., Cal/miles.

Land Passenger Transport

Table Overview 
In the following table the energy efficiency and energy consumption for different types of passenger land vehicles and modes of transport, as well as standard occupancy rates, are presented. The sources for these figures are in the correspondent section for each vehicle, in the following article. The conversions amongst different types of units, are well known in the art.

For the conversion amongst units of energy in the following table, 1 litre of petrol amounts to 34.2 MJ, 1 kWh amounts to 3.6 MJ and 1 kilocalorie amounts to 4184 J. For the car occupation ratio, the value of 1.2 passengers per automobile was considered. Nonetheless, in Europe this value slightly increases to 1.4. The sources for conversions amongst units of measurements appear only of the first row.

Land transport means

Walking 

Velomobile 

Velomobiles (enclosed recumbent bicycles) have the highest energy efficiency of any known mode of personal transport because of their small frontal area and aerodynamic shape. Real energy from food used by human is 4–5 times more. Unfortunately their energy efficiency advantage over bicycles becomes smaller with decreasing speed and disappears at around 10 km/h where power needed for velomobiles and triathlon bikes are almost the same.

Bicycle 

A standard lightweight, moderate-speed bicycle is one of the most energy-efficient forms of transport. This means that a bicycle will use between 10 and 25 times less energy per distance travelled than a personal car, depending on fuel source and size of the car. This figure does depend on the speed and mass of the rider: greater speeds give higher air drag and heavier riders consume more energy per unit distance. In addition, because bicycles are very lightweight (usually between 7–15 kg) this means they consume very low amounts of materials and energy to manufacture. In comparison to an automobile weighing 1500 kg or more, a bicycle typically requires 100–200 times less energy to produce than an automobile. In addition, bicycles require less space both to park and to operate and they damage road surfaces less, adding an infrastructural factor of efficiency.

Motorised bicycle 
This makes an electric bicycle one of the most efficient possible motorised vehicles, behind only a motorised velomobile and an electric unicycle (EUC).

Electric kick scooter 

Intended to fit into a last mile niche and be ridden in bike lanes, they require little skill from the rider. Because of their light weight and small motors, they are extremely energy-efficient with a typical energy efficiency of 1.1 kW⋅h (4.0 MJ) per 100 km (1904 MPGe 810 km/L 0.124 L/100 km), even more efficient than bicycles and walking. However, as they must be recharged frequently, they are often collected overnight with motor vehicles, somewhat negating this efficiency. The lifecycle of electric scooters is also notably shorter than that of bicycles, often reaching only a single digit number of years.

Electric Unicycle 
An electric unicycle (EUC) cross electric skateboard variant called the Onewheel Pint can carry a 50 kg person 21.5 km at an average speed of 20 km/h. The battery holds 148Wh. Without taking energy lost to heat in the charging stage into account, this equates to an efficiency of 6.88Wh/km or 0.688kWh/100 km. Additionally, with regenerative braking as a standard design feature, hilly terrain would have less impact on an EUC compared to a vehicle with friction brakes such as a push bike. This combined with the single wheel ground interaction may make the EUC the most efficient known vehicle at low speeds (below 25 km/h), with the velomobile overtaking the position as most efficient at higher speeds due to superior aerodynamics.

Automobiles 

Automobiles are generally inefficient when compared to other modes of transport, due to the relatively high weight of the vehicle compared to its occupants. 

Automobile fuel efficiency is most commonly expressed in terms of the volume of fuel consumed per one hundred kilometres (l/100 km), but in some countries (including the United States, the United Kingdom and India) it is more commonly expressed in terms of the distance per volume fuel consumed (km/L or miles per gallon). 
This is complicated by the different energy content of fuels such as petrol and diesel. 
The Oak Ridge National Laboratory (ORNL) states that the energy content of unleaded petrol is 115,000 British thermal unit (BTU) per US gallon (32 MJ/L) compared to 130,500 BTU per US gallon (36.4 MJ/L) for diesel.

Due to the efficiency of electric motors, electric cars are much more efficient than their internal combustion engine counterparts, consuming on the order of 38 megajoules (38 000 kJ) per 100 km in comparison to 142 megajoules per 100 km for combustion powered cars.

A second important consideration is the energy costs of producing energy. 
Bio-fuels, electricity and hydrogen, for instance, have significant energy inputs in their production. 
Hydrogen production efficiency are 50–70% when produced from natural gas, and 10–15% from electricity.
The efficiency of hydrogen production, as well as the energy required to store and transport hydrogen, must to be combined with the vehicle efficiency to yield net efficiency. 
Because of this, hydrogen automobiles are one of the least efficient means of passenger transport, generally around 50 times as much energy must be put into the production of hydrogen compared to how much is used to move the car.

A third consideration to take into account when calculating energy efficiency of automobiles is the occupancy rate of the vehicle. 
Although the consumption per unit distance per vehicle increases with increasing number of passengers, this increase is slight compared to the reduction in consumption per unit distance per passenger. 
This means that higher occupancy yields higher energy efficiency per passenger. 
Automobile occupancy varies across regions. For example, the estimated average occupancy rate is about 1.3 passengers per car in the San Francisco Bay Area, while the 2006 UK estimated average is 1.58.

Fourth, the energy needed to build and maintain roads is an important consideration, as is the energy returned on energy invested (EROEI). 
Between these two factors, roughly 20% must be added to the energy of the fuel consumed, to accurately account for the total energy used.

Finally, vehicle energy efficiency calculations would be misleading without factoring the energy cost of producing the vehicle itself. 
This initial energy cost can of course be depreciated over the life of the vehicle to calculate an average energy efficiency over its effective life span. In other words, vehicles that take a lot of energy to produce and are used for relatively short periods will require a great deal more energy over their effective lifespan than those that do not, and are therefore much less energy efficient than they may otherwise seem. Hybrid and electric cars use less energy in their operation than comparable petroleum-fuelled cars but more energy is used to manufacture them, so the overall difference would be less than immediately apparent. Compare, for example, walking, which requires no special equipment at all, and an automobile, produced in and shipped from another country, and made from parts manufactured around the world from raw materials and minerals mined and processed elsewhere again, and used for a limited number of years.
According to the French energy and environment agency ADEME, an average motor car has an embodied energy content of 20,800 kWh and an average electric vehicle amounts to 34,700 kWh. The electric car requires nearly twice as much energy to produce, primarily due to the large amount of mining and purification necessary for the rare earth metals and other materials used in lithium-ion batteries and in the electric drive motors. This represents a significant portion of the energy used over the life of the car (in some cases nearly as much as energy that is used through the fuel that is consumed, effectively doubling the car's per-distance energy consumption), and cannot be ignored when comparing automobiles to other transport modes. As these are average numbers for French automobiles and they are likely to be significantly larger in more auto-centric countries like the United States and Canada, where much larger and heavier cars are more common.

Driving practices and vehicles can be modified to improve their energy efficiency by about 15%.

On a percentage basis, if there is one occupant in an automobile, only about 0.5% of the total energy used is used to move the person in the car, while the remaining 99.5% (about 200 times more) is used to move the car itself.

Example consumption figures 

 Solar cars are electric vehicles that use little or no externally supplied energy other than from sunlight, charging the batteries from built-in solar panels, and typically use less than 3 kW·h per 100 miles (67 kJ/km or 1.86 kW·h/100 km). Most of these cars are race cars designed for competition and not for passenger or utility use. However several companies are designing solar cars for public use. As of December 2021, none have yet been released.
 The four passenger GEM NEV uses , which equates to 2.6 kW·h/100 km per person when fully occupied, albeit at only .
 Chevrolet Volt in full electric mode uses , meaning it may approach or exceed the energy efficiency of walking if the car is fully occupied with 4 or more passengers, although the relative emissions produced may not follow the same trends if analysing environmental impacts.
Both cars are rare to find on the popular market. The Daihatsu had major problems with rust and structural safety which contributes to its rarity and the quite short production run.
 Honda Insight – achieves  under real-world conditions.
 2012 Cadillac CTS-V Wagon 6.2 L Supercharged, 
 2012 Bugatti Veyron, 
 2018 Honda Civic: 
 2017 Mitsubishi Mirage: 
 2017 Hyundai Ioniq hybrid: 
 2017 Toyota Prius:  (Eco trim)
 2018 Nissan Leaf: /100 mi (671 kJ/km) or 112 MPGe
 2017 Hyundai Ioniq EV: /100 mi (560 kJ/km) or 136 MPGe
2020 Tesla model 3: 24 kWh (86.4 MJ)/100 mi (540 kJ/km) or 141 MPGe

Trains 

Trains are in general one of the most efficient means of transport for freight and passengers. Advantages of trains include low friction of steel wheels on steel rails, as well as an intrinsic high occupancy rate. Train lines are typically used to serve urban or inter-urban transit applications where their capacity utilization is maximized.

Efficiency varies significantly with passenger loads, and losses incurred in electricity generation and supply (for electrified systems), and, importantly, end-to-end delivery, where stations are not the originating final destinations of a journey. While electric motors used in most passenger trains are more efficient than internal combustion engines, power generation in thermal power plants is limited to (at best) Carnot efficiency and there are transmission losses on the way from the power plant to the train. Switzerland, which has electrified virtually its entire railway network (heritage railways like the Dampfbahn Furka-Bergstrecke being notable exceptions), derives much of the electricity used by trains from hydropower, including pumped hydro storage. While the mechanical efficiency of the turbines involved is comparatively high, pumped hydro involves energy losses and is only cost effective as it can consume energy during times of excess production (leading to low or even negative spot prices) and release the energy again during high-demand times. with some sources claiming up to 87%.

Actual consumption depends on gradients, maximum speeds, and loading and stopping patterns. Data produced for the European MEET project (Methodologies for Estimating Air Pollutant Emissions) illustrate the different consumption patterns over several track sections. The Siemens Velaro D type ICE trains seat 460 (16 of which in the restaurant car) in their 200-meter length edition of which two can be coupled together. The data also reflects the weight of the train per passenger. For example, TGV double-deck Duplex trains use lightweight materials, which keep axle loads down and reduce damage to track and also save energy. The TGV mostly runs on French nuclear fission power plants which are again limited – as all thermal power plants – to Carnot efficiency. Due to nuclear reprocessing being standard operating procedure, a higher share of the energy contained in the original Uranium is used in France than in e.g. the United States with its once thru fuel cycle.

The specific energy consumption of the trains worldwide amounts to about 150 kJ/pkm (kilojoule per passenger kilometre) and 150 kJ/tkm (kilojoule per tonne kilometre) (ca. 4.2 kWh/100 pkm and 4.2 kWh/100 tkm) in terms of final energy. Passenger transportation by rail systems requires less energy than by car or plane (one seventh of the energy needed to move a person by car in an urban context,). This is the reason why, although accounting for 9% of world passenger transportation activity (expressed in pkm) in 2015, rail passenger services represented only 1% of final energy demand in passenger transportation.

Freight 
Energy consumption estimates for rail freight vary widely, and many are provided by interested parties. Some are tabulated below.

Passenger

Braking losses 

Stopping is a considerable source of inefficiency. Modern electric trains like the Shinkansen (the Bullet Train) use regenerative braking to return current into the catenary while they brake. A Siemens study indicated that regenerative braking might recover 41.6% of the total energy consumed. The Passenger Rail (Urban and Intercity) and Scheduled Intercity and All Charter Bus Industries Technological and Operational Improvements – FINAL REPORT states that "Commuter operations can dissipate more than half of their total traction energy in braking for stops." and that "We estimate head-end power to be 35 percent (but it could possibly be as high as 45 percent) of total energy consumed by commuter railways." Having to accelerate and decelerate a heavy train load of people at every stop is inefficient despite regenerative braking which can recover typically around 20% of the energy wasted in braking. Weight is a determinant of braking losses.

Buses 

 In July 2005, the average occupancy for buses in the UK was stated to be 9 passengers per vehicle.
 The fleet of 244  1982 New Flyer trolley buses in local service with BC Transit in Vancouver, Canada, in 1994/95 used 35,454,170 kWh for 12,966,285 vehicle km, or 9.84 MJ/vehicle km.  Exact ridership on trolleybuses is not known, but with all 34 seats filled this equates to 0.32 MJ/passenger km.  It is quite common to see people standing on Vancouver trolleybuses.  This is a service with many stops per kilometre; part of the reason for the efficiency is the use of regenerative braking.
With all 55 seats filled this equates to 330 passenger mpg; with 70% filled, 231 passenger mpg.
 In 2011 the fleet of 752 buses in the city of Lisbon had an average speed of 14.4 km/h and an average occupancy of 20.1 passengers per vehicle.
 Battery electric buses combine the electric motive power of a trolleybus, the drawbacks of battery manufacture, weight and lifespan with the routing flexibility of a bus with any onboard power. Major manufacturers include BYD and Proterra.

Other 
 NASA's Crawler-Transporter was used to haul the Saturn V and Space Shuttle rockets from storage to the launch pad. It uses diesel and has one of the highest fuel consumption rates on record, .

Air transport means

Aircraft 

A principal determinant of energy consumption in aircraft is drag, which must be in the opposite direction of motion to the craft.
 Drag is proportional to the lift required for flight, which is equal to the weight of the aircraft. As induced drag increases with weight, mass reduction, with improvements in engine efficiency and reductions in aerodynamic drag, has been a principal source of efficiency gains in aircraft, with a rule-of-thumb being that a 1% weight reduction corresponds to around a 0.75% reduction in fuel consumption.
 Flight altitude affects engine efficiency. Jet-engine efficiency increases at altitude up to the tropopause, the temperature minimum of the atmosphere; at lower temperatures, the Carnot efficiency is higher. Jet engine efficiency is also increased at high speeds, but above about Mach 0.85 the airframe aerodynamic losses increase faster.
 Compressibility effects: beginning at transonic speeds of around Mach 0.85, shockwaves form increasing drag.
 For supersonic flight, it is difficult to achieve a lift to drag ratio greater than 5, and fuel consumption is increased in proportion. However, the faster speed inherent to supersonic flight means that the higher fuel burn is counterbalanced by a shorter flight duration.

Passenger airplanes averaged 4.8 L/100 km per passenger (1.4 MJ/passenger-km) (49 passenger-miles per gallon) in 1998. On average 20% of seats are left unoccupied. Jet aircraft efficiencies are improving: Between 1960 and 2000 there was a 55% overall fuel efficiency gain (if one were to exclude the inefficient and limited fleet of the DH Comet 4 and to consider the Boeing 707 as the base case). Most of the improvements in efficiency were gained in the first decade when jet craft first came into widespread commercial use. Compared to advanced piston engine airliners of the 1950s, current jet airliners are only marginally more efficient per passenger-mile. Between 1971 and 1998 the fleet-average annual improvement per available seat-kilometre was estimated at 2.4%. Concorde the supersonic transport managed about 17 passenger-miles to the Imperial gallon; similar to a business jet, but much worse than a subsonic turbofan aircraft. Airbus puts the fuel rate consumption of their A380 at less than 3 L/100 km per passenger (78 passenger-miles per US gallon).

The mass of an aircraft can be reduced by using light-weight materials such as titanium, carbon fibre and other composite plastics. Expensive materials may be used, if the reduction of mass justifies the price of materials through improved fuel efficiency. The improvements achieved in fuel efficiency by mass reduction, reduces the amount of fuel that needs to be carried. This further reduces the mass of the aircraft and therefore enables further gains in fuel efficiency. For example, the Airbus A380 design includes multiple light-weight materials.

Airbus has showcased wingtip devices (sharklets or winglets) that can achieve 3.5 percent reduction in fuel consumption. There are wingtip devices on the Airbus A380. Further developed Minix winglets have been said to offer 6 percent reduction in fuel consumption. Winglets at the tip of an aircraft wing smooth out the wing-tip vortex (reducing the aircraft's wing drag) and can be retrofitted to any airplane.

NASA and Boeing are conducting tests on a  "blended wing" aircraft. This design allows for greater fuel efficiency since the whole craft produces lift, not just the wings. The blended wing body (BWB) concept offers advantages in structural, aerodynamic and operating efficiencies over today's more conventional fuselage-and-wing designs. These features translate into greater range, fuel economy, reliability and life cycle savings, as well as lower manufacturing costs. NASA has created a cruise efficient STOL (CESTOL) concept.

Fraunhofer Institute for Manufacturing Engineering and Applied Materials Research (IFAM) have researched a shark skin imitating paint that would reduce drag through a riblet effect. Aircraft are a major potential application for new technologies such as aluminium metal foam and nanotechnology such as the shark skin imitating paint.

Propeller systems, such as turboprops and propfans are a more fuel efficient technology than jets. But turboprops have an optimum speed below about 450 mph (700 km/h). This speed is less than used with jets by major airlines today. For instance, Airbus has patented aircraft designs with twin rear-mounted counter-rotating propfans. NASA has conducted an Advanced Turboprop Project (ATP), where they researched a variable pitch propfan that produced less noise and achieved high speeds.

Related to fuel efficiency is the impact of aviation emissions on climate.

Small aircraft 

 Motor-gliders can reach an extremely low fuel consumption for cross-country flights, if favourable thermal air currents and winds are present.
 At 160 km/h, a diesel powered two-seater Dieselis burns 6 litres of fuel per hour, 1.9 litres per 100 passenger km.
 at 220 km/h, a four-seater 100 hp MCR-4S burns 20 litres of gas per hour, 2.2 litres per 100 passenger km.
 Under continuous motorised flight at 225 km/h, a Pipistrel Sinus burns 11 litres of fuel per flight hour. Carrying 2 people aboard, it operates at 2.4 litres per 100 passenger km.
 Ultralight aircraft Tecnam P92 Echo Classic at cruise speed of 185 km/h burns 17 litres of fuel per flight hour, 4.6 litres per 100 passenger km (2 people). Other modern ultralight aircraft have increased efficiency; Tecnam P2002 Sierra RG at cruise speed of 237 km/h burns 17 litres of fuel per flight hour, 3.6 litres per 100 passenger km (2 people).
 Two-seater and four-seater flying at 250 km/h with old generation engines can burn 25 to 40 litres per flight hour, 3 to 5 litres per 100 passenger km.

Water transport means

Ships

Queen Elizabeth 

Cunard stated that Queen Elizabeth 2 travelled 49.5 feet per imperial gallon of diesel oil (3.32 m/L or 41.2 ft/US gal), and that it had a passenger capacity of 1777. Thus carrying 1777 passengers we can calculate an efficiency of 16.7 passenger miles per imperial gallon (16.9 L/100 p·km or 13.9 p·mpg–US).

Cruise ships
 has a capacity of 6,296 passengers and a fuel efficiency of 14.4 passenger miles per US gallon. Voyager-class cruise ships have a capacity of 3,114 passengers and a fuel efficiency of 12.8 passenger miles per US gallon.

Emma Maersk 
Emma Maersk uses a Wärtsilä-Sulzer RTA96-C, which consumes 163 g/kW·h and 13,000 kg/h. If it carries 13,000 containers then 1 kg fuel transports one container for one hour over a distance of 45 km.

Assuming the Emma Maersk consumes diesel (as opposed to fuel oil which would be the more precise fuel) then 1 kg diesel = 1.202 litres = 0.317 US gallons. This corresponds to 46,525 kJ. Assuming a standard 14 tonnes per container (per teu) this yields 74 kJ per tonne-km at a speed of 45 km/h (24 knots).

Boats 
A sailboat, much like a solar car, can locomote without consuming any fuel. A sail boat such as a dinghy using just wind power requires no input energy in terms of fuel. However some manual energy is required by the crew to steer the boat and adjust the sails using lines. In addition energy will be needed for demands other than propulsion, such as cooking, heating or lighting. The fuel efficiency of a single-occupancy boat is highly dependent on the size of its engine, the speed at which it travels, and its displacement. With a single passenger, the equivalent energy efficiency will be lower than in a car, train, or plane.

International transport comparisons

European Public transport 
Rail and bus are generally required to serve 'off peak' and rural services, which by their nature have lower loads than city bus routes and inter city train lines. Moreover, due to their 'walk on' ticketing it is much harder to match daily demand and passenger numbers. As a consequence, the overall load factor on UK railways is 35% or 90 people per train:

Conversely, airline services generally work on point-to-point networks between large population centres and are 'pre-book' in nature. Using yield management, overall load factors can be raised to around 70–90%. Intercity train operators have begun to use similar techniques, with loads reaching typically 71% overall for TGV services in France and a similar figure for the UK's Virgin Rail Group services.

For emissions, the electricity generating source needs to be taken into account.

US Passenger transport 
The US Transport Energy Data Book states the following figures for passenger transport in 2018. These are based on actual consumption of energy, at whatever occupancy rates there were. For modes using electricity, losses during generation and distribution are included. Values are not directly comparable due to differences in types of services, routes, etc.

US Freight transport 
The US Transport Energy book states the following figures for freight transport in 2010:

From 1960 to 2010 the efficiency of air freight has increased 75%, mostly due to more efficient jet engines.

Compare:
 Space Shuttle used to transport freight to the other side of the Earth (see above): 40 megajoules per tonne-kilometre.
 Net energy for lifting: 10 megajoules per tonne-kilometre.

Canadian transport 
Natural Resources Canada's Office of Energy Efficiency publishes annual statistics regarding the efficiency of the entire Canadian fleet. For researchers, these fuel consumption estimates are more realistic than the fuel consumption ratings of new vehicles, as they represent the real world driving conditions, including extreme weather and traffic.  The annual report is called Energy Efficiency Trends Analysis.  There are dozens of tables illustrating trends in energy consumption expressed in energy per passenger km (passengers) or energy per tonne km (freight).

French environmental calculator 
The environmental calculator of the French environment and energy agency (ADEME) published in 2007 using data from 2005 enables one to compare the different means of transport as regards the  emissions (in terms of carbon dioxide equivalent) as well as the consumption of primary energy. In the case of an electric vehicle, the ADEME makes the assumption that 2.58 toe as primary energy are necessary for producing one toe of electricity as end energy in France (see Embodied energy: In the energy field).

This computer tool devised by the ADEME shows the importance of public transport from an environmental point of view. It highlights the primary energy consumption as well as the  emissions due to transport. Due to the relatively low environmental impact of radioactive waste, compared to that of fossil fuel combustion emissions, this is not a factor in the tool. Moreover, intermodal passenger transport is probably a key to sustainable transport, by allowing people to use less polluting means of transport.

German environmental costs 
Deutsche Bahn calculates the energy consumption of their various means of transportation.

Note - External costs not included above 

To include all the energy used in transport, we would need to also include the external energy costs of producing, transporting and packaging of fuel (food or fossil fuel or electricity), the energy incurred in disposing of exhaust waste, and the energy costs of manufacturing the vehicle. For example, a human walking requires little or no special equipment while automobiles require a great deal of energy to produce and have relatively short product lifespans.

However, these external costs are independent of the energy cost per distance travelled, and can vary greatly for a particular vehicle depending on its lifetime, how often it is used and how it is energized over its lifetime. Thus this article's numbers include none of these external factors.

See also 
ACEA agreement
Alternative fuel vehicle
Brake-specific fuel consumption
Corporate average fuel economy (CAFE)
Emission standard
Fuel economy in automobiles
Fuel-management systems
Gas-guzzler
Gasoline gallon equivalent
Life-cycle assessment
Marine fuel management
Thrust-specific fuel consumption
Vehicular metrics
Von Kármán–Gabrielli diagram - What Price Speed?
Transport
Speed record

Footnotes

External links 
 ECCM Study for rail, road and air journeys between main UK cities

 Traction Summary Report 2007– Prof. Roger Kemp 
 Transport Energy Data Book (US)
 Fuel Consumption Ratings
 Infographic on Energy Efficiency in Transportation

Webarchive template wayback links
 
Energy conservation
Fuels
Energy use comparisons